Sasnett is a surname. Notable people with the surname include:

Daniel Sasnett (born 1978), American professional stock car racing driver
William J. Sasnett (1820–1865), American educator and university president